Marinomonas vaga is a bacterium from the genus of Marinomonas which has been isolated from seawater from Hawaii.

References

Oceanospirillales
Bacteria described in 1972